The shorttail chub ('Gila brevicauda'') is a cyprinid fish endemic to streams in the Sierra Madre Occidental of  Mexico.

References

Chubs (fish)
Gila (fish)
Taxa named by Wendell L. Minckley 
Fish described in 2003
Freshwater fish of Mexico